Rigden may refer to:

People with the surname
Horace Walter Rigden (1898–1986), English chemist and oil industry executive
John S. Rigden, physicist

Other uses
Kings of Shambhala